Dan Luther Pippin (October 20, 1926 – April 1, 1965) was an American basketball player who played for the University of Missouri.  He later captained the American basketball team at the 1952 Summer Olympics that won the gold medal in Helsinki. He played in all eight games.

After Pippin graduated from the University of Missouri he went to work for the Caterpillar Tractor Company in Peoria, Illinois, and played for the National Industrial Basketball League team it sponsored, the Peoria Cats.  Pippin later moved to New Mexico where he engaged in the insurance business before returning to his native Missouri. He committed suicide in 1965.

References

External links
profile
Greater Peoria Sports Hall of Fame

1926 births
1965 suicides
Basketball players at the 1952 Summer Olympics
Basketball players from St. Louis
Guards (basketball)
Medalists at the 1952 Summer Olympics
Missouri Tigers men's basketball players
Olympic gold medalists for the United States in basketball
Peoria Caterpillars players
United States men's national basketball team players
American men's basketball players
People from Waynesville, Missouri
Suicides in Missouri
Suicides by carbon monoxide poisoning